Uthaug is a village in the municipality of Ørland in Sør-Trøndelag county, Norway.

Uthaug may also refer to:

HNoMS Uthaug (S304), submarines of the Royal Norwegian Navy

People with the surname
Jørleif Uthaug (1911–1990), Norwegian illustrator, painter and sculptor
Roar Uthaug (born 1973), Norwegian film director